Leucodonta bicoloria, the white prominent, is a moth from the family Notodontidae. It ranges from Western Europe (Ireland) to Hokkaido (Japan) being found in the northern part of Middle Europe, Northern Europe and Russia to the Amur region. In the western parts of the range it is a local and rare species. It is likely extirpated in Britain but a population was recently rediscovered in Ireland. The habitat requirements of the species are a bit unusual, it seems to prefer locally warm deciduous and mixed forests, where birch, the sole host plant, forms the canopy (except Japan(Sorba). The moth survives winter as a pupa underground.

The moths reach a wingspan of 28 to 36 millimeters. They are distinctively patterned. All wings have a snow-white ground color. On the forewings there is a typical, clearly orange-yellow marking approximately in the form of a Y, framed by two other, smaller spots of the same colour. On the outer edge of the forewings there are some small black dots. The lower wings at the inner edge have very fine white hairs.

The egg is flat arched of white, yellowish or light green colour. The caterpillar is smooth with only a few hairs. It is yellow-green, with two dark green, yellowish dorsal lines, as well as black stigmas and golden yellow stripes above the feet. The head is dark green. The pupa is slender and cylindrical, rounded at the end. 

In Central Europe, light birch forests, bogs, as well as warm slopes and heaths with birch trees are the preferred habitat.
In Central Europe the moths fly annually in a generation from mid-May to the end of June. They are nocturnal and also fly to artificial light sources. The caterpillars are found from mid-June to the end of August. They feed predominantly on the leaves of birch trees (Betula). Both the moths and the caterpillars prefer to stay in the treetops. Pupation takes place in a web on the earth. The pupa hibernates.

References

Further reading
South R. (1907) The Moths of the British Isles,  (First Series), Frederick Warne & Co. Ltd.,  London & NY: 359 pp. online

External links

White prominent on UKmoths
Fauna Europaea
Lepiforum.de
Vlindernet.nl 

Notodontidae
Moths of Japan
Moths of Europe
Taxa named by Michael Denis
Taxa named by Ignaz Schiffermüller